Ancylophyes villosa is a species of moth of the family Tortricidae. It is found in northern Argentina.

The ground colour of the forewings is brownish, suffused with green in the dorsal and terminal halves and along the costa. The hindwings are rather dark and brown, but paler basally. Adults have been recorded on wing in December.

Etymology
The species name refers to the dense vestiture (hairs) of the pulvinus and is derived from Latin villosa (meaning shaggy).

References

Moths described in 2007
Enarmoniini
Taxa named by Józef Razowski
Moths of South America